Enniskillen is a township in the Canadian province of Ontario, within Lambton County. It is located at the intersection of Highway 21 (Oil Heritage Road) and Rokeby Line. The economy of the township is based on agriculture. It was named after Sir Galbraith Lowry Cole's father who was the Earl of Enniskillen, Northern Ireland.

Communities
The township comprises the communities of Oil City, Glen Rae and Marthaville, and surrounds but does not include the independent municipalities of Petrolia and Oil Springs.

Demographics 

See also
List of townships in Ontario

References

External links 

Township municipalities in Ontario
Lower-tier municipalities in Ontario
Municipalities in Lambton County